St John the Baptist's Church, Collingham is a Grade I listed parish church of the Church of England in the village of Collingham, Nottinghamshire.

History
The church dates from the 12th century. Restoration work was undertaken by the Rector, Rev. Joseph Mayor, in 1846. Another restoration was carried out in 1862–1863 by J. H. Hakewill, when the gallery was removed and the arches were restored, the chancel walls raised and a new timber roof provided. Other work included stuccoing the walls, restoring memorial tablets, reglazing the windows with cathedral glass, and inserting new stone dressings. A new pulpit and lectern in pine and the altar rail in oak were installed. Tablets of zinc were fixed to the walls displaying the Ten Commandments. A number of new open benches of Memel timber were placed in the nave, to match those installed at the time of the restoration in 1846.

The tower was restored in 1886 and there was a further restoration in 1890.

List of incumbents

Parish status
Collingham is one of a group of parishes which includes: 
St Bartholomew's Church, Langford
St Giles' Church, Holme
St Cecilia's Church, Girton
All Saints' Church, Harby
St George the Martyr's Church, North & South Clifton
All Saints' Church, Collingham
St Helena's Church, South Scarle
Holy Trinity Church, Besthorpe
St Helen's Church, Thorney
All Saints' Church, Winthorpe

Organ
The organ was enlarged by Forster and Andrews in 1863. It was replaced in 1883 by a new instrument made by Wordsworth and Maskell.

The Bells
The peal of five bells dates from 1841 and was cast by Thomas Mears.

References

Church of England church buildings in Nottinghamshire
Grade I listed churches in Nottinghamshire